The Ben Ali Stakes is an American race for thoroughbred horses run in the Spring of each year at Keeneland Race Course in Lexington, Kentucky.  For 4-year-olds and up, it is a Grade III event set at a distance of one mile and one eighth mile on the dirt.  In its 87th running in 2017, it currently offers a purse of $200,000.

According to the official history at Keeneland racetrack, the Ben Ali (pronounced Ah-Lie) is named for James Ben Ali Haggin (1822–1914), a lawyer who made a fortune during the California Gold Rush and who used much of that money to create the biggest horse breeding farm in the world: the Rancho Del Paso near Sacramento, California. He also owned Elmendorf Farm in Lexington, Kentucky with its thousands of acres of prime Kentucky bluegrass. Haggin became a noteworthy breeder of great racehorses and a fervent supporter of the sport.  Haggin owned the Hall of Famers, Salvator and the filly, Firenzi.

The first running of the Ben Ali took place in 1917 at the Lexington Race Course where it was raced through 1932 after which the track closed.  It did not run again until it was revived at Keeneland in 1937.

Decidedly, the winner of the 1962 Kentucky Derby, won this race in 1963, and Pistols and Roses in 1994.

Records
Speed record
 1:46.78 Midway Road (2004) (new stakes and track record)
 1:46.77 Wise Dan (2012) set polytrack record.
Most wins by a jockey

 4 – Robby Albarado (1998, 2003, 2004, 2005)
 4 – Javier Castellano (2006, 2011, 2018, 2022)

Most wins by a horse trainer

 5 – Neil J. Howard (1999, 2003, 2004, 2005, 2016)

Most wins by an owner

 5 – William S. Farish III (1999, 2003, 2004, 2005, 2016)

Winners since 1993

External links
 Keeneland Official site

References

Graded stakes races in the United States
Grade 3 stakes races in the United States
Keeneland horse races
Recurring sporting events established in 1917
1917 establishments in Kentucky